Hebei District is a district of the municipality of Tianjin, People's Republic of China. Its name literally means "District north of the River", as the district is located on the northern shore of the Hai River, part of the Grand Canal. Tianjin's famous Zhongshan Park lies within the district. Tianjin's North Train Station and many other train structures are also located in Hebei District. The district administers ten streets in total.

Administrative divisions
There are 10 subdistricts in the district:

Transportation

Metro
Hebei is currently served by two metro lines operated by Tianjin Metro:

  - Jianguodao
  - Jinshiqiao, Zhongshanlu, Beizhan, Tiedonglu, Zhangxingzhuang

References

External links

Districts of Tianjin